Xunfenggang Station is an elevated terminus of Guangzhou Metro Line 6. It start operations on December 28, 2013. It is located at the south of Xunfenggang, A1 Road, Jinshazhou, Baiyun District. Since the terminus approaches near Lishui, Nanhai District, Foshan over Xunfenggang, many residents suggested extending Guangzhou Metro from Xunfenggang to Lishui. Guangzhou authorities are considering the suggestion.

Station layout

Exits

References

Guangzhou Metro stations in Baiyun District
Railway stations in China opened in 2013